Manta Aisora (3 October 1981 in Sapporo) is a Japanese writer. He is best known for the series Haiyore! Nyaruko-san which was adapted into anime.

In 2012 he was awarded the 1st Prize awarded by GA Bunko for Yumemiru mama ni machi itari (夢見 る ま ま に 待 ち い た り) for one of the novels in the Haiyore! Nyaruko-san series.

Works

References

External links 
Entry at ANN Encyclopedia
aisoramanta on twitter

1981 births
Japanese writers
Living people
People from Sapporo
Writers from Hokkaido